The steppe mammoth (Mammuthus trogontherii, sometimes Mammuthus armeniacus) is an extinct species of Elephantidae that ranged over most of northern Eurasia during the late Early and Middle Pleistocene, approximately 1.8 million-200,000 years ago. It evolved in Siberia during the Early Pleistocene from Mammuthus meridionalis. It was the ancestor of the woolly mammoth and Columbian mammoth of the later Pleistocene. Populations of steppe mammoth may have persisted in northern China and Mongolia as late as 33,000 years ago.

Taxonomy

There is confusion about the correct scientific name for the steppe mammoth, either Mammuthus armeniacus (Falconer 1857) or Mammuthus trogontherii (Pohlig 1885). Falconer used material from Asian sources while Pohlig worked with fossil remains from Europe and both names appear in scientific publications, adding to the confusion. A first taxonomical overhaul was done by Maglio (1973) who decided that both names were synonyms, armeniacus being the older, hence the preferred name. However, in Shoshani & Tassy (1996) it was decided that the description of Pohlig prevailed, and consequently the correct name for the steppe mammoth is M. trogontherii. It is unclear whether both forms are indeed identical and authors tend to use the name M. trogontherii for European material and M. armeniacus for Asian remains.

Several Japanese mammoth varieties from the early Pleistocene have been named, but all are now thought to be synonyms of M. trogontherii.

Genetics 
DNA has been sequenced from two Siberian mammoth molars (which judging by morphology belong to the steppe mammoth); at over a million years old, this is the oldest ancient DNA ever recovered. The two genomes recovered belong to separate and distinct lineages: one is ancestral to the woolly mammoth, the other is a previously-unknown lineage. The latter lineage hybridized with woolly mammoths at least 420,000 years ago, giving rise to the Columbian mammoth.

Description
 
The steppe mammoth had a short skull compared with M. meridionalis as well as a smaller jaw.

A skeleton mounted on the Azov Museum reaches  at the shoulder, though this figure might be overestimated because the vertebrae have been placed between the tips of the shoulder blades.

Discovery

Fossilized teeth are recovered, but skeletal parts are rare. The most complete skeleton of a steppe mammoth yet found was discovered in 1996 in Kikinda, Serbia. It was mounted, and put on display in 2005.

Another quite complete steppe mammoth was excavated in the cliffs of West Runton in Norfolk, UK; it preserves its jaws and teeth but is missing the upper part of its skull. A rare skull found in Auvergne, France, in 2008 will be examined by Dick Mol and Frédéric Lacombat in the Musée Crozatier in Le Puy-en-Velay.

However, Wei et al. (2010), who restudied the fossils referred to M sungari, considered this species to be a junior synonym of M. trogontherii. The authors state that some of the fossils are referrable to M. trogontherii, while the others can be referred to M. primigenius, according to morphological characters and measurements.

There are 8 skeletons in Russia museums, including 3 complete ones. Recently one was discovered in Okhansk rayon, Perm kray.

Evolution 
M. trogontherii is derived from Mammuthus meridionalis, the oldest records M. trogontherii are known from China, at around 1.8-2 million years ago, from the Nihewan Formation near Majuangou, Hebei. Steppe mammoths arrived in North America across Beringia around 1.5-1.3 million years ago, giving rise to the Columbian mammoth (the ancestor was previously thought to be M. meridionalis but this was due to misinterpretation of tooth wear patterns). Steppe mammoths replaced Mammuthus meridionalis between 1-0.7 million years ago in Europe, in a complex diachronous mosaic pattern. European populations of M. trogontherii experienced a persistent size reduction towards the end of the Middle Pleistocene. A population of M. trogontherii in north east Siberia developed higher tooth plate count after 0.8 mya, reaching M. primigenius (woolly mammoth) morphology by 400,000 years ago. Mammoths with M. primigenius type molar morphology displaced those of M. trogontherii type in Europe around 200,000 years ago (~MIS 7/6 boundary) in a highly complex pattern that likely reflects regional migration and introgression. Relict populations of M. trogontherii may have persisted in Mongolia and North China well into the Last Glacial Period, with teeth of M. trogontherii like morphology in Shanxi being dated to 33,858–24,857 years BP and Inner Mongolia to c. 33,700 years BP.

See also

Elephas recki
Mammuthus columbi
Palaeoloxodon
Paraceratherium
West Runton Mammoth

References

Further reading

 (English and French)

External links
The Kikinda mammoth

Pleistocene mammals of Europe
Mammoths
Pleistocene proboscideans
Fossils of Serbia